Jatinga Ityadi is an Assamese language film directed by Sanjib Sabhapandit. The film was screened in the International Film Festival of India (IFFI) 2007 in the Indian Panorama section. The film depicts the current scenario of militancy in Assam.

Plot
A British couple visits Assam looking for the graveyard of the man's grandfather who was once a tea planter. With a view to drawing international attention, an underground rebel group kidnaps the couple. But being unable to communicate with the foreign couple, the outfit picks up an educated but frustrated youth who is fluent in English. Eager to be a part of that so-called "movement" of the group, the boy readily jumps in. But inside the hideout, Manab, the protagonist, discovers that the idea he had of the militant group and its "struggle for independence" was entirely wrong. He decides to help the British couple escape. In the process he is killed in a crossfire with all the militants present in the scene.

Title of the film

Speaking about the significance of the film title, Sabhapadit informed that Jatinga is a small place in Assam where birds are said to commit suicide. But this is not the case - birds do not actually commit suicide, they are lured to death. At night, people hold bamboo torches to attract these birds and when they fly close, they are clubbed to death. Same way in the guise of a revolution the boys are lured into a death trap. Drawing a similarity between the birds and the youth, he chose that title for his movie.

Cast
Bishnu Khargharia as Ratnakanta
Bina Patangia as Ratnakanta’s wife
Saurabh Hazarika as Manab
Mallika Sarma as Rita
Anup Hazarika as Dhan
Lakhi Borthakur as Rita’s father
Tony Richmond as Mr. Tony
James Parry as Jack
Sarah Bugden as Pauline
Kuntol Goswami as 47
Garima Patowari as Paahi
Baharul Islam as Padri
Binoy Deka as Deka
Amitabh Rajkhowa as Bubu
Arun Hazarika as Shop Keeper

See also
Jollywood

References

External links
Ruchira Arts - Official Website

Assamese-language films
2007 films
Films set in Assam
2000s Assamese-language films